Tanner Shane Gray (born April 15, 1999) is an American professional racing driver who has competed in drag racing and stock car racing. He competes full-time in the NASCAR Craftsman Truck Series, driving the No. 15 Toyota Tundra for TRICON Garage. Gray is the youngest professional driver to win a national event in NHRA history, and the youngest driver to win an NHRA season championship.

Racing career

Drag racing

2017 marked the first year for Gray racing in the Pro Stock class within the NHRA Mello Yello Drag Racing Series alongside his Father Shane Gray.

Gray made NHRA history 13 days before his 18th birthday at the 18th Annual Denso Spark Plug Nationals at The Strip at Las Vegas Motor Speedway on April 2, 2017, by winning the final round against Bo Butner. He was 17 years, 11 months, and 18 days which was younger than 40-year record holder Jeb Allen, who was 18 years, 1 month, and 8 days.

He won the 2017 Auto Club Road to the Future Award. The award is given to the top rookie from all of the sport's pro categories, including Pro Stock Motorcycle, Top Fuel and Funny Car.

In 2018, Gray won 8 times en route to the Pro Stock title, becoming the youngest ever NHRA season champion.

NASCAR

On September 25, 2018, Gray announced he would race in the NASCAR K&N Pro Series East for DGR-Crosley in 2019. The move came after Gray had met team owner David Gilliland in summer 2018. He picked up his first win at South Boston Speedway in early May.

In October 2019, Gray made his NASCAR Gander Outdoors Truck Series debut with DGR-Crosley at Martinsville Speedway in the No. 15 Toyota Tundra; running a three-race schedule, he also competed in the ISM Raceway and Homestead–Miami Speedway events in the No. 7.

On December 16, 2019, DGR-Crosley announced Gray would run full-time and for rookie of the year in the Truck Series in 2020, driving the team's No. 15 truck, now a Ford F-150 after the team switched from Toyota to Ford in the offseason. In addition, the team announced he would continue to drive in the East Series, now the ARCA Menards Series East, part-time, as well as part-time in the big 20-race ARCA Menards Series, where he would share the full-time No. 17 car with his younger brother Taylor (who ran the Sioux Chief Showdown races) and Anthony Alfredo.

Other racing

Gray has raced in different types of cars, including Late models, modifieds, Midget cars, and stock cars. He has raced on oval dirt tracks in the area of Mooresville, including racing in the Mini Outlaw Karts category alongside Kyle Larson and Rico Abreu on Wednesday nights at Millbridge Speedway in Salisbury.

Personal life

Gray was born April 15, 1999, to professional drag racer and national event champion Shane Gray and his wife Amber of Artesia, New Mexico. He is the grandson of funny car and pro stock champion Johnny Gray, making Tanner a third-generation Gray to race in the NHRA. The Gray family moved from New Mexico to Mooresville, North Carolina in 2010 so that Shane Gray could pursue a career as a professional drag racer in the NHRA. Tanner's younger brother, Taylor Gray, is also a NASCAR and ARCA driver for DGR and currently competes full-time for them in the ARCA Menards Series East as well as part-time in the ARCA Menards Series, both in the No. 17 car.

Motorsports career results

NASCAR
(key) (Bold – Pole position awarded by qualifying time. Italics – Pole position earned by points standings or practice time. * – Most laps led.)

Craftsman Truck Series

 Season still in progress
 Ineligible for series points

K&N Pro Series West

ARCA Menards Series
(key) (Bold – Pole position awarded by qualifying time. Italics – Pole position earned by points standings or practice time. * – Most laps led.)

ARCA Menards Series East

References

External links
 
 

Dragster drivers
Racing drivers from New Mexico
1999 births
Living people
People from Artesia, New Mexico
NASCAR drivers